Mount Nordhill is a high,  sharp-pointed peak between Steel Peak and Kosky Peak in the east ridge of the Welch Mountains, in Palmer Land. The peak was mapped by United States Geological Survey (USGS) in 1974. Named by Advisory Committee on Antarctic Names (US-ACAN) for Commander Claude H. Nordhill, U.S. Navy, Operations Officer of Squadron VXE-6 in Antarctica during Operation Deep Freeze, 1970, and Commanding Officer, 1972.

See also
Giannini Peak

References

Mountains of Palmer Land